The 1986 Grand Prix de Tennis de Toulouse was a men's tennis tournament played on indoor Carpet courts in Toulouse, France that was part of the Regular Series of the 1986 Grand Prix tennis circuit. It was the fifth edition of the tournament and was held from 6 October until 12 October 1986. Seventh-seeded Guy Forget won the singles title.

Finals

Singles

 Guy Forget defeated  Jan Gunnarsson, 4–6, 6–3, 6–2

Doubles

 Miloslav Mečíř /  Tomáš Šmíd defeated  Jakob Hlasek /  Pavel Složil, 6–2, 3–6, 6–4.

References

External links
 ITF tournament edition details

Grand Prix de Tennis de Toulouse
Grand Prix de Tennis de Toulouse
Grand Prix de Tennis de Toulouse
Grand Prix de Tennis de Toulouse